Fred David Miller (August 8, 1940 – February 25, 2023) was an American football defensive tackle in the National Football League from 1963 through 1972. During that span, he appeared in 3 world championship games for the Baltimore Colts: the 1964 NFL championship game against the Browns, Super Bowl III against the Jets, and Super Bowl V against the Cowboys. He played college football at Louisiana State University.

Miller was born in Homer, Louisiana, on August 8, 1940. His father was a sharecropper.

Miller graduated from Homer High School in his hometown in 1958. A four-year football letterman, he mostly played center and tackle and was a starter in his last three years at the school.

With both the National Football League (NFL) and American Football League (AFL) competing against each other to acquire the best available talent, Miller was picked in both drafts in 1962. He was selected by the NFL's Baltimore Colts in the 7th round (93rd overall) and the AFL's Oakland Raiders in the 26th round (201st overall). He eventually signed with the Colts.

Miller died in Timonium, Maryland, on February 25, 2023, at the age of 82.

References

External links
 Klingaman, Mike. "Catching Up With...former Colt Fred Miller," The Baltimore Sun, Tuesday, September 8, 2009.

1940 births
2023 deaths
People from Homer, Louisiana
Players of American football from Louisiana
American football defensive tackles
LSU Tigers football players
Baltimore Colts players
Western Conference Pro Bowl players